John Sterling is a former running back in the National Football League. He played with the Green Bay Packers during the 1987 NFL season.

References

1964 births
Living people
People from Altus, Oklahoma
Green Bay Packers players
American football running backs
Central Oklahoma Bronchos football players
National Football League replacement players